U.S. Highway 30 (US 30) is a major east–west U.S. Highway which spans  across the state of Iowa.  It is the longest primary highway in the state and is maintained by the Iowa Department of Transportation (Iowa DOT).  The route in Iowa begins at the Missouri River crossing at Blair, Nebraska, and ends at the Mississippi River crossing at Clinton, Iowa.  Along the way, it serves Denison and Carroll in western Iowa, Boone, Ames, and Marshalltown in central Iowa, and Tama, Cedar Rapids, and DeWitt in eastern Iowa.  Cutting across the central portion of the state, US 30 runs within close proximity of the Union Pacific Railroad's Overland Route for its entire length.

US 30 was conceived as a part of the Lincoln Highway, the first transcontinental highway in the United States.  A route through Iowa was chosen because of the important link between Omaha, Nebraska, and Chicago, Illinois.  As the U.S. Highway System came into being in the 1920s, and the Lincoln Highway became US 30, federal money started to pay for paving Iowa's dirt roads.  By 1931, the route had been paved across the entire state.

The route of the Lincoln Highway and US 30 has accommodated the changing needs of the traveling public. Towards the middle of the 20th century, the route was straightened, bypassing most downtown areas and several towns altogether. More recently, long sections of US 30 have been upgraded to a four-lane expressway to accommodate increasing traffic. Since 2006, the highway has been designated an Iowa Heritage Byway by Iowa DOT, the first highway in the state with that distinction.

Route description
US 30 extends from west to east across the central portion of Iowa, with much of the highway traveling through rolling farmland.  Small towns dot the entire route, which connects the larger cities of Denison, Ames, Cedar Rapids, and Clinton.  Between Ogden and Mount Vernon, significant portions of the highway have been upgraded to a four-lane freeway.

Western Iowa
US 30 enters the western end of Iowa by crossing the Missouri River on the Blair Bridge, located east of the Nebraska town of the same name. Adjacent to the highway bridge is the Union Pacific Railroad's river crossing for the Overland Route. The highway runs roughly parallel to the rail line for its entire run across Iowa. For , traffic moves through the flat Missouri River bottoms, passing DeSoto National Wildlife Refuge on the way to Missouri Valley. At Missouri Valley, it intersects Interstate 29 (I-29) at a partial cloverleaf interchange. It enters the Boyer River valley through the Loess Hills, a region of wind-deposited silt extending from north of Sioux City to extreme northwestern Missouri. US 30 enters Logan and intersects the eastern end of Iowa Highway 127 (Iowa 127).

The highway enters Crawford County north of Dunlap in Harrison County.  For , US 30 passes through farmland and the small communities of Dow City and Arion.  For  through Denison, it overlaps US 59 and Iowa 141, which run concurrently through the town.  The Iowa DOT refers to routes which overlap other routes as duplicate routes.  It follows the East Boyer River through Denison as the Boyer River forks west of the northern intersection with US 59 / Iowa 141. US 30 travels north-northeasterly towards Vail.  Between Vail and Westside, the highway ceases following the East Boyer River and heads due east towards Arcadia and Carroll in Carroll County.

At Carroll it intersects US 71 on the western side of the city.  Continuing east, the highway goes through the town of Glidden and passes to the north of Ralston, west of the Greene County line.  North of Scranton it meets the northern end of Iowa 25.  Between Scranton and Jefferson, US 30 crosses the Raccoon River.  US 30 crosses Iowa 4 and Iowa 144 on the northern edge of Jefferson and Grand Junction, the latter of the cities named for its location at the junction of the historic Chicago & Northwestern and Chicago, Rock Island and Pacific Railroads, now both owned by Union Pacific, respectively.  East of Grand Junction, the highway passes over the Overland Route where it stays south of the railroad until Le Grand.

Central Iowa
 west of Ogden, US 30 is joined by US 169 from the north.  The two highways run concurrently until reaching Ogden, where the road becomes a four-lane expressway.  US 169 exits to the south at a partial cloverleaf interchange, while US 30 continues east through Boone County and descends into the Des Moines River valley.  It ascends from the valley and travels another  to a four-way stop in Boone, which is the last stop along the route until Iowa 1 in Mt. Vernon, though this is now a roundabout.   east of Boone, it meets Iowa 17 at a diamond interchange.   east of that interchange is a shortcut to northbound Iowa 17.

Traffic is filtered into Ames and Iowa State University (ISU) from US 30 through five interchanges. The South Dakota Avenue interchange primarily serves the southwestern part of Ames. The University Boulevard (formerly Elwood Drive) exit provides access to the Iowa State University campus and Iowa State Center, ISU's cultural and athletics complex. The Duff Avenue interchange provides access to Ames's east side. US 69 and Interstate 35 Business Loop are designated along Duff Avenue. From Duff to I-35, US 30 is overlapped by the I-35 Business Loop. Between the Duff and Dayton Avenue interchanges, it crosses the South Skunk River. The Dayton Avenue interchange serves hotels and restaurants and is a travel stop for I-35 travelers.

East of the Dayton Avenue interchange is I-35, which connects US 30 to Minneapolis, Minnesota, to the north, and Des Moines to the south. Continuing east, the expressway travels  to Nevada,  more to the US 65 interchange at Colo,  to  State Center, and  the Iowa 330 interchange on the western edge of Marshalltown.   to the east are two half-interchanges with U.S. Route 30 Business (US 30 Business). Near Marshalltown Community College, it intersects Iowa 14 at a diamond interchange. The 18th Avenue interchange on the southeastern side of Marshalltown is the eastern end of the business loop. From Marshalltown, it travels  to Le Grand, crossing over the Overland Route rail corridor on the west side. It bypasses Le Grand to the north, where it intersects the northern end of Iowa 146 at a diamond interchange. Continuing east, the highway enters Tama County. It rises over a large hill north of Montour and then descends into the Iowa River valley.

East of the Iowa River is the Meskwaki Settlement, which is home to about 800 Meskwaki Indians and the Meskwaki Casino and Resort. As it heads into the Tama–Toledo area, the expressway bisects the two communities. Between the two cities, it meets US 63 at a partial cloverleaf interchange. From US 63 it turns to the southeast to skirt Tama's east side.

Eastern Iowa
US 30 and US 218 travel together due east towards Cedar Rapids, passing Norway and Atkins. On the western end of Cedar Rapids, US 30 / US 218 turn to the southeast at the 16th Avenue SW interchange.   to the southeast is the Williams Boulevard interchange, where US 151 joins US 30 and US 218. For , US 30 / US 151 / US 218 is a wrong-way concurrency; that is, where two or more routes heading in opposite directions share the same highway. In this instance, US 30 is the main east–west road while US 151 and US 218 are duplicate routes, nominally heading north and south, respectively. At the I-380 interchange, US 218 leaves US 30 / US 151 and joins the Avenue of the Saints highway. East of I-380, US 30 / US 151 serve as a divider between the Lincolnway Village neighborhood to the south and a light industrial district to the north.

South of Bertram, the two routes cross the Cedar River before US 151 splits away from US 30 to the north at a trumpet interchange. This interchange is the southern end of Iowa 13. The road dips southeast, ultimately bypassing the cities of Mount Vernon and Lisbon, while converging back into a 2-lane road at the conclusion of the bypass. Over the next , US 30 passes through a small town every . In Cedar County it passes through Mechanicsville, Stanwood, Clarence and Lowden. In Clinton County, it passes through Wheatland, Calamus, and Grand Mound before reaching a full cloverleaf interchange with US 61 at DeWitt.

US 30 continues east as an expressway, passing DeWitt to the south.   east of DeWitt, it crosses back over to the north side of the Overland Route. West of the Clinton city limits is an interchange with Clinton County Road Z36 (CR Z36), which serves Low Moor and as a shortcut to southbound US 67. East of CR Z36, it passes the Clinton Municipal Airport and a large chemical plant. US 30 / US 67 head east along Lincoln Way and ascend  onto a plateau, atop which reside stores and restaurants. As they continue east, the two routes split into one-way streets, eastbound Liberty Avenue and westbound Camanche Avenue. The one-way street alignment ends at 11th Avenue South, but quickly begins again as US 30 / US 67 turn to the north onto northbound South Third Street and southbound South Fourth Street. At Eighth Avenue South, US 30 splits away from US 67 and onto the Gateway Bridge and crosses into Illinois.

History
The path which US 30 follows has changed since it was originally planned as the Lincoln Highway in the early 1910s.  The first path connected as many downtown areas as possible, in order to create awareness about the Good Roads Movement and the Lincoln Highway.  As the primary highway system of Iowa matured, and the Lincoln Highway yielded to US 30, the highway was gradually straightened, leaving many towns off the route.  More recently, new construction has routed traffic away from the straighter roads and onto sections of freeway and expressway.

Lincoln Highway

US 30 was created with the U.S. Highway System in 1926, but the route it takes dates back to 1913, when the Lincoln Highway Association (LHA) designated the route across the country. The brainchild of Carl Fisher, the Lincoln Highway was the first highway to cross the United States, connecting New York City to San Francisco. In Iowa, it was uncertain exactly where the Lincoln Highway would run. As of August 1913, no definite route had been planned; the only certainty was the route would pass through Iowa. Iowans raised over $5 million (equivalent to $ in  dollars) for the construction of the road. On September 14, 1913, the Lincoln Highway Association announced the route. The route was marked by a red, white, and blue tricolor emblazoned with an L.  The route markers were painted upon telephone poles, bridges, and nearby buildings to show travelers the way.

While not ideal for transcontinental travel, Iowa's dirt roads were of high quality. Foreigners even compared them to the best roads in France. However, the same could not be said when they were wet. The mud was so thick and viscous it was nicknamed "gumbo". To show travelers the obvious benefits of paved roads, the Lincoln Highway Association began the process of creating seedling miles of paved roads. Seedling miles were placed at least  from the nearest town and in areas where the terrain was rough. Between August 1918 and June 1919, Iowa's first seedling mile was built in Linn County, west of Mount Vernon.

Despite the success of the seedling miles across the country, Iowa lagged behind other states in improving its roads. Before 1924, Iowa's 99 counties, not the state highway commission, were responsible for the construction and maintenance of the state's roads. When counties could afford to build roads, the Iowa State Highway Commission required extensive grading to be performed before paving could occur. In 1922, only five percent of Iowa's roads, were paved. By 1924, twenty percent of the Lincoln Highway in Iowa had been paved, and by 1931, it was paved continuously from New York City to Missouri Valley, Iowa.

1930s–1950s

Starting in the 1930s, the route's alignment began to be straightened. By the mid-1930s, it was routed west of Missouri Valley on old Iowa 130. The US 30 alignment south of Missouri Valley became U.S. Highway 30 Alternate. By 1952, it had moved south of Marshalltown and was replaced by Iowa 330 and a  southern jaunt through Belle Plaine had been replaced by a straight road. In 1955, a couple of routing changes occurred. In Cedar Rapids, it began its move to the south, avoiding the downtown area, and in Clinton, it was rerouted over the Gateway Bridge, allowing Iowa 136 to cross the Lyons-Fulton Bridge. However, by 1957, the old alignment through Clinton and across the Lyons-Fulton Bridge was numbered U.S. Highway 30 Alternate.

1960s–1980s
In the 1960–1970s, Iowa DOT started to build freeway segments along US 30. By the end of the 1960s, both of the alternate routes had been turned over to local jurisdictions. The western route became Iowa 183, and the eastern route reverted to Iowa 136. By 1973, that new stretch of road had been extended  along a four-lane bypass around Ames. The old alignment became Iowa 930. In eastern Iowa, a new,  freeway connected DeWitt and Clinton by 1976. By 1985, the bypass of Cedar Rapids had been completed from 16th Avenue SW to Iowa 13 near Bertram. The bypass was extended  further west in 1989. Between 1996 and 2000, an $8.2-million extension (equivalent to $ in  dollars) was built to connect the bypass to the western intersection of US 218.

Since the Cedar Rapids bypass was completed in 1985, on occasion, traffic has had to be rerouted off of US 30.  The bypass's proximity to the Union Pacific Railroad mainline resulted in an elevated roadway between Edgewood Road and Sixth Street SW.  When strong winds come from the south, fog produced by an Archer Daniels Midland plant adjacent to the highway billows over the road making driving dangerous.  The Iowa DOT set up an emergency detour from Edgewood Road SW north to 16th Avenue SW east to 6th Street SW back to US 30.  The frequency of fog-related detours has decreased in recent years due to improved technology and the plant's expansion and relocation of cooling towers away from the highway.

1990s to the present
The 1990s saw more construction of four-lane roads along US 30. Stretches of four-lane roads that had already been constructed were extended towards other communities. In Story County, it was widened to four lanes from the I-35 interchange to US 65 at Colo. That road, Iowa Avenue in Marshalltown, was designated as U.S. Route 30 Business, the first business route along US 30 in Iowa.

Since the beginning of the 21st century, Iowa DOT has continued to widen US 30 to four lanes.  In 2004, an $18.6-million (equivalent to $ in  dollars), four-lane section opened from east of Marshalltown to the Meskwaki Settlement west of Tama, bypassing Le Grand.  In 2010, two sections of expressway were completed.  A  section from Colo to State Center opened to westbound travelers on November 29, while the eastbound lanes opened a week later.  The  section, which bypasses the Tama/Toledo area, opened in two segments.  The first of which opened on November 1, and the second on November 25.  On July 7, 2011, a section from State Center to Iowa 330 opened in Marshall County. On November 22, 2019, an  extension opened, bypassing Mt. Vernon and Lisbon. In June 2021, a  segment opened in Tama County.

Legacy of the Lincoln Highway

While the Lincoln Highway has not been an official route for  years, it is still a source of pride in the communities and regions through which it passed.  Nearly 85 percent of the original Lincoln Highway is still drivable, although much is gravel.  Most of what is drivable is either along US 30 or within .  The Lincoln Highway bridge in Tama was built in 1915.  It was restored in the 1980s after local officials feared losing the then-deteriorating bridge.  Preston's Service Station, a landmark of Belle Plaine, has become a Lincoln Highway museum.  Monuments were built along the route to honor not only Abraham Lincoln, but to honor Iowans who were influential for planning its route.

In 1992, the Lincoln Highway Association was reformed with a chapter in each state through which the highway passed.  The new LHA is a historical preservation group that wants to preserve the remaining sections of the highway.  The Iowa chapter of the LHA has, since 2008, sponsored a tour of the Lincoln Highway.  To keep friendly to classic cars, the tour does not travel upon the sections of the road which are gravel.  After years of lobbying by the LHA, the Iowa Department of Transportation, in 2006, designated the Lincoln Highway the first Iowa Heritage Byway.  The 2010 Transportation Map of Iowa showed the path designated as the Iowa Heritage Byway for the first time.

Major intersections

See also

Special routes of U.S. Route 30

References

External links

U.S. Route 030 in Iowa
30
 Iowa
Transportation in Harrison County, Iowa
Transportation in Crawford County, Iowa
Transportation in Carroll County, Iowa
Transportation in Greene County, Iowa
Transportation in Boone County, Iowa
Transportation in Story County, Iowa
Transportation in Marshall County, Iowa
Transportation in Tama County, Iowa
Transportation in Benton County, Iowa
Transportation in Linn County, Iowa
Transportation in Cedar County, Iowa
Transportation in Clinton County, Iowa